The 2016 general election in Yukon, Canada, took place on November 7, 2016, to return members to the 34th Yukon legislative assembly.

The election was fought over issues relating to the economy, the environment, First Nations reconciliation, fracking, and the merits of a territorial carbon tax. Sandy Silver's Liberal Party won an upset victory over the incumbent Yukon Party government led by Darrell Pasloski, who lost his own seat in the riding of Mountainview.

Pre-writ period
 August 17, 2012: Darius Elias resigns as interim Liberal leader and sits as an independent.
 July 8, 2013: Darius Elias crosses the floor to the Yukon Party.
 March 1, 2014: Sandy Silver agrees to lead the Liberal Party.
 May 10, 2016: David Laxton stepped down as Speaker and as a member of the Yukon Party caucus to sit as an Independent MLA due to personal reasons. It would later come out that the resignation was due to an allegation of sexual harassment leveled at Laxton. One month later, the Yukon Party would bar Laxton from running for the party in the upcoming election.
 June 8, 2016: Education Minister and veteran territorial and municipal politician Doug Graham announces he will not seek re-election in his riding of Porter Creek North.
 June 15, 2016: Currie Dixon, minister for Community Services, announces he will not seek a second term as MLA for Copperbelt North. In 2011, Dixon became the Yukon's youngest-ever cabinet minister at the age of 26.
 Aug. 11, 2016: After saying he would not run in the upcoming territorial election, Education Minister Doug Graham announced he would seek the Yukon Party nomination in Whitehorse Centre. Graham has been the Yukon Party MLA for Porter Creek North since 2011.
 October 7, 2016: Premier Darrell Pasloski calls the election for November 7, 2016, starting the official 31-day campaign period.

2016 Campaign

During the campaign, the issues of economic diversification, environmental management, and First Nations reconciliation were central themes, as was each party's stance on fracking. The announcement that the federal government would impose a national carbon tax also affected the political direction of the campaign, with the Yukon Party vowing to fight any effort to impose a carbon tax on the Yukon.

The incumbent Yukon Party, led by Darrell Pasloski since 2011, had governed the Yukon since 2002 when it defeated the Yukon Liberal Party. While the Yukon Party had been re-elected in 2011 during a commodity boom, by 2016 the Yukon economy was in a recession. Leading into the 2016 campaign, the Yukon Party was drawing criticism over its poor relationship with First Nations, its stance on the environment, access to healthcare, and a perceived mismanagement of the Yukon economy.

The Yukon Party ran on a campaign of True North. Central to this campaign was prioritizing the creation of jobs, growing the economy, and keeping taxes low. It also adamantly opposed the federal carbon tax.

The Yukon Party entered the 2016 campaign with ten of its twelve MLAs seeking re-election, albeit it with two running in different ridings (Scott Kent and Doug Graham).

The Yukon New Democratic Party, led by Liz Hanson, had been the Official Opposition since 2011. The party had been critical of the Yukon Party's relationship with First Nations, its stewardship of the economy, and its management of government services such as healthcare.

The Yukon New Democratic Party ran on a campaign of Building a Better Yukon. The party emphasized the need for a change in government, and championed causes such as improving the healthcare system, transparent government, First Nations reconciliation, and economic diversification. It supported investing a federal carbon tax in green energy and low income supports.

All six Yukon New Democratic Party MLAs sought re-election.

The Yukon Liberal Party, led by Sandy Silver, held only one seat after Darius Elias joined the Yukon Party. The Liberal platform, Be Heard, promoted economic diversification, responsible environmental management, and improving First Nations relations. The Liberals promised to return funds raised from a federal carbon tax back to Yukoners.

Despite having only one seat, the party gained visibility in late 2015 following the election the Liberal Party of Canada to a majority government; it had also been the Third Party. The Yukon Liberal Party had led in the two opinion polls prior to the election period, despite holding just one seat in the legislature – Sandy Silver's district of Klondike. The Liberals also gained attention due to a series of high-profile contested nominations that helped build the profile of their candidates and party in the lead up to the campaign.

The Yukon Green Party, led by Frank De Jong, running in its second election, championed the issue of climate change and electoral reform. It also opposed the public funding of Catholic schools. The Green Party had no incumbent MLAs leading into the election, but managed to run five candidates during the campaign.

Controversy arose when the Chief Electoral Officer launched two inquiries during the campaign, citing concerns about proxy voting, special ballots, and purposeful misinformation by all three candidates in the Mountainview riding, as well as the use of proxy votes by Liberal candidate Tamara Goeppel in the Whitehorse Centre riding. The Chief Electoral Officer eventually ruled that there was no wrongdoing in Mountainview, but her inquiry into Whitehorse Centre led the RCMP to press charges in February 2017.

The election also marked a continued trend in the turnout at advance polls, which had doubled in each of the previous two elections. In the 2016 election, advanced turnout doubled again, with 6,437 voters casting advance or special ballots. This represented more than one-in-three votes cast in the election overall (18,787).

Results

The Yukon Liberal Party was elected to a majority government on November 7, 2016, with 11/19 seats. The 2016 election resulted in one of the single-largest gain of seats for a party in Yukon history (+10), tying for the Yukon Party win of 2002. It was the Liberals' second time being elected to power in the Yukon.

The Liberals also posted their best ever returns in rural Yukon, winning four of eight rural seats. In Whitehorse, the Liberals posted their second-best returns in party history, taking seven of eleven seats (the party had swept the city in the 2000 election). However, despite winning the popular vote comfortably, many Liberal margins of victory were quite narrow.

A judicial recount was later held to confirm the results in the districts of Vuntut Gwitchin and Mountainview. It was determined that in both instances, the Liberal candidate won by seven votes.

The Yukon Party saw five of its MLAs re-elected, with one new candidate, Geraldine Van Bibber, elected. However, Premier Pasloski, Deputy Premier Elaine Taylor, and ministers Mike Nixon and Doug Graham were all defeated. The party also failed to retain two of the three seats where incumbents had not sought re-election.

The New Democratic Party lost four of its six seats, with party leader Liz Hanson and incumbent Kate White the only two re-elected. In two ridings, New Democrat incumbents lost narrowly to Liberal star candidates: Kevin Barr lost to former Whitehorse City Councillor and environmental scientist John Streicker by 14 votes in Mount Lorne-Southern Lakes and Jan Stick lost to former Ombudsman Tracy McPhee by 37 votes in Riverdale South. It was the party's worst electoral showing since 1978.

No Green Party candidate was elected.

Surprisingly, the number of individual votes received by the Yukon Party and the New Democrats was also largely unchanged; each party received only about 200 votes less than it had in 2011. The gain in Liberal support (+3,500 votes) could possibly be attributable in part to the increase in Yukon population between 2011 and 2016. In ridings where the population had increased notably in that time - Whitehorse West, Porter Creek Centre, Mount Lorne-Southern Lakes, Whitehorse Centre, Porter Creek North, Takhini-Kopper King, and Copperbelt South - Liberal support rose substantially over the last campaign. Despite this increase in votes, however, the Yukon Liberal Party still received a smaller share of the popular vote than the Yukon Party did in the 2011 election. In some of these larger ridings too, the Liberals saw a significant increase in votes, only to lose still.

Turnout was 79.9% (18,787 votes), the highest in Yukon history and the highest since 1996.

Campaign Donations

The election marked the highest-ever levels of expenditures and revenue (cash and in-kind) by the Yukon political parties in an election year. In 2016, Elections Yukon reported that the Yukon Party raised $236,015, the Yukon Liberal Party raised $233,243, the Yukon New Democrats raised $165,817, and the Yukon Green Party raised $5,948. Compared to the 2011 election, this was a drastic increase. In that campaign, the Yukon Party raised $153,892.90, the Yukon Liberal Party raised $71,159.53, the Yukon New Democrats raised $75,616.35, and the Yukon Green Party raised $575. The then-active Yukon First Nations Party raised $1,104. Nonetheless, despite a significant increase in fundraising revenue, all three major parties reported significant campaign deficits in 2016.

Overall, the Yukon Liberals benefited from the largest single corporate contribution in Yukon history of $50,000, while the Yukon Party benefited from the most corporate donations and the New Democrats from the most individual donations. Of particular interest was that the Yukon Liberal Party in 2016 raised more than five times what it raised collectively between 2011 and 2015. Nearly a quarter of the Liberals' donations came from large donations from mining companies.

Whitehorse Centre Investigation

During the 2016 campaign, Liberal candidate for Whitehorse Centre, Tamara Goeppel, was accused of soliciting proxy ballots from ten homeless people in her riding. Proxy votes, a form of franchise in which voters surrender their vote to another in their stead, are intended for use only by voters who have reason to believe they will be absent from the territory on voting day and advanced polling days.

The Chief Electoral Officer opened an investigation into Goeppel during the campaign, and despite calls to drop Goeppel as a candidate, Liberal Leader Sandy Silver continued to support her candidacy. Goeppel was defeated by New Democrat Leader Liz Hanson on election night.

In February 2017, the Chief Electoral Officer's investigation led to the RCMP charging Goeppel with two counts of "aiding or abetting persons in making proxy applications that were not in accordance with Section 106 of the (Yukon Elections) Act," and one count of "inducing persons to falsely declare on proxy application that they would be absent from the Yukon during the hours fixed for voting." If convicted, Goeppel faces a $5,000 fine, up to a year in jail, or both.

Goeppel entered a plea of not guilty in June 2017. Her trial date is not yet determined. She is the first person to be charged under the Yukon Elections Act.

Standings

|- style="background:#ccc;"
! rowspan="2" colspan="2" style="text-align:left;"|Party
! rowspan="2" style="text-align:left;"|Party leader
!rowspan="2"|Candidates
! colspan="4" style="text-align:center;"|Seats
!colspan="3" style="text-align:center;"|Popular vote
|- 
!2011
!Dissol.
!2016
!+/-
!#
!%
!+/-

|align=left|Sandy Silver
|align="right"|19
|align="right"|2
|align="right"|1
|align="right"|11
|align="right"|+9
|align="right"|7,404
|align="right"|39.41%
|align="right"|+14.2%

|align=left|Darrell Pasloski
|align="right"|19
|align="right"|11
|align="right"|11
|align="right"|6
|align="right"|-5
|align="right"|6,272
|align="right"|33.38%
|align="right"|-7.1%

|align=left|Liz Hanson
|align="right"|19
|align="right"|6
|align="right"|6
|align="right"|2|align="right"|-4
|align="right"|4,928
|align="right"|26.23%
|align="right"|-6.4%

|align=left|Frank De Jong
|align="right"|5
|align="right"|0
|align="right"|0
|align="right"|0
|align="right"|0
|align="right"|145
|align="right"|0.77%
|align="right"|+0.1%

| colspan="2" style="text-align:left;"|Independent
|align="right"|1
|align="right"|0
|align="right"|1
|align="right"|-
|align="right"|0
|align="right"|38
|align="right"|0.20%
|align="right"|-0.3%
|-
| style="text-align:left;" colspan="3"|Invalid votes
| style="text-align:right;"| -
| style="text-align:right;"| -
| style="text-align:right;"| -
| style="text-align:right;"| -
| style="text-align:right;"|-
| style="text-align:right;"|53
| style="text-align:right;"|-
| style="text-align:right;"|-
|-
| style="text-align:left;" colspan="3"|Total| style="text-align:right;"|63| style="text-align:right;"|19| style="text-align:right;"|19| style="text-align:right;"|19| style="text-align:right;"|
| style="text-align:right;"|18,840| style="text-align:right;"|
| style="text-align:right;"|
|-
| style="text-align:left;" colspan="3"|Registered voters/turnout
| style="text-align:right;"| -
| style="text-align:right;"| -
| style="text-align:right;"| -
| style="text-align:right;"| -
| style="text-align:right;"| -
| style="text-align:right;"| 24,668
| style="text-align:right;"| 76.37
| style="text-align:right;"|-
|}

CandidatesBold incumbents indicates cabinet members and party leaders and the speaker of the assembly are italicized. 

Rural Yukon

|-
| style="background:whitesmoke;"|Klondike
| ||Brad Whitelaw365 (31.4%)
| ||Jay Farr111 (9.5%)
|| ||Sandy Silver687 (59.1%)
| ||
| ||
|| ||Sandy Silver
|-
| style="background:whitesmoke;"|Kluane
|| ||Wade Istchenko338 (43.3%)
| ||Sally Wright153 (19.5%)
| ||Mathieya Alatini289 (37.1%)
| ||
| ||
|| ||Wade Istchenko|-
| style="background:whitesmoke;"|Lake Laberge
|| ||Brad Cathers558 (46.5%)
| ||Anne Tayler261 (21.8%)
| ||Alan Young342 (28.5%)
| ||Julie Anne Ames38 (3.2%)
| ||
|| ||Brad Cathers|-
| style="background:whitesmoke;"|Mayo-Tatchun
| ||Cory Bellmore166 (22.7%)
| ||Jim Tredger233 (31.9%)
|| ||Don Hutton331 (45.3%)
| ||
| ||
|| ||Jim Tredger
|-
| style="background:whitesmoke;"|Mount Lorne-Southern Lakes
| ||Rob Schneider284 (24.2%)
| ||Kevin Barr437 (37.3%)
|| ||John Streicker451 (38.5%)
| ||
| ||
|| ||Kevin Barr
|-
| style="background:whitesmoke;"|Pelly-Nisutlin
|| ||Stacey Hassard280 (42.4%)
| ||Ken Hodgins207 (31.3%)
| ||Carl Sidney152 (23.0%)
| ||Frank De Jong22 (3.3%)
| ||
|| ||Stacey Hassard|-
| style="background:whitesmoke;"|Vuntut Gwitchin
| ||Darius Elias70 (46.7%)
| ||Skeeter Wright3 (2.0%)
|| ||Pauline Frost77 (51.3%)
| ||
| ||
|| ||Darius Elias
|-
| style="background:whitesmoke;"|Watson Lake
|| ||Patti McLeod299 (38.9%)
| ||Erin Labonte219 (28.5%)
| ||Ernie Jamieson212 (27.6%)
| ||
| ||Victor Kisoun38 (5.0%)
|| ||Patti McLeod
|}

Whitehorse

|-
| style="background:whitesmoke;"|Copperbelt North
| ||Pat McInroy529 (42.1%)
| ||André Bourcier161 (12.8%)
|| ||Ted Adel566 (45.1%)
| ||
| ||
|| ||Currie Dixon†
|-
| style="background:whitesmoke;"|Copperbelt South
|| ||Scott Kent§449 (36.9%)
| ||Lois Moorcroft331 (27.2%)
| ||Jocelyn Curteanu425 (34.9%)
| ||Phillipe Leblond12 (1.0%)
| ||
|| ||Lois Moorcroft
|-
| style="background:whitesmoke;"|Mountainview
| ||Darrell Pasloski399 (31.4%)
| ||Shaunagh Stikeman432 (34.1%)
|| ||Jeanie Dendys439 (34.5%)
| ||
| ||
|| ||Darrell Pasloski|-
| style="background:whitesmoke;"|Porter Creek Centre
| ||Michelle Kolla379 (36.3%)
| ||Pat Berrel213 (20.4%)
|| ||Paolo Gallina452 (43.3%)
| ||
| ||
|| ||David Laxton†
|-
| style="background:whitesmoke;"|Porter Creek North
|| ||Geraldine Van Bibber435 (44.0%)
| ||Francis van Kessel145 (14.7%)
| ||Eileen Melnychuk372 (37.6%)
| ||Mike Ivens37 (3.7%)
| ||
|| ||Doug Graham§
|-
| style="background:whitesmoke;"|Porter Creek South
| ||Mike Nixon285 (39.4%)
| ||Shirley Chua-Tan102 (14.1%)
|| ||Ranj Pillai337 (46.6%)
| ||
| ||
|| ||Mike Nixon|-
| style="background:whitesmoke;"|Riverdale North
| ||Mark Beese258 (23.1%)
| ||Rod Snow337 (30.2%)
|| ||Nils Clarke486 (43.5%)
| ||Kristina Calhoun36 (3.2%)
| ||
|| ||Scott Kent§
|-
| style="background:whitesmoke;"|Riverdale South
| ||Danny Macdonald323 (28.6%)
| ||Jan Stick384 (34.0%)
|| ||Tracy McPhee421 (37.3%)
| ||
| ||
|| ||Jan Stick
|-
| style="background:whitesmoke;"|Takhini-Kopper King
| ||Vanessa Innes229 (17.5%)
|| ||Kate White605 (46.1%)
| ||Jeane Lassen478 (36.4%)
| ||
| ||
|| ||Kate White
|-
| style="background:whitesmoke;"|Whitehorse Centre
| ||Doug Graham§193 (17.4%)
|| ||Liz Hanson487 (43.8%)
| ||Tamara Goeppel432 (38.9%)
| ||
| ||
|| ||Liz Hanson
|-
| style="background:whitesmoke;"|Whitehorse West
| ||Elaine Taylor433 (43.6%)
| ||Stu Clark106 (10.7%)
|| ||Richard Mostyn455 (45.8%)
| ||
| ||
|| ||Elaine Taylor'''
|}

§ - denotes incumbent MLAs who have opted to run in another district† - denotes a retiring incumbent MLA

Opinion polls

References

External links
Elections Yukon

2016 elections in Canada
Elections in Yukon
November 2016 events in Canada